Bill Curtsinger (also known as William R. Curtsinger) is an American photographer and writer who publishes on underwater photography and natural history subjects. Curtsinger has photographed thirty-five articles, including six cover stories for National Geographic as well as a cover story for Life. His photos have also appeared in Smithsonian, Natural History, various scientific journals and a number of books worldwide.

Early life and childhood

As a teenager Curtsinger was inspired to photograph the underwater arena by reading Jacques Cousteau's book, The Silent World: A Story of Undersea Discovery and Adventure. Cousteau was an award-winning underwater diver who captured exotic underwater videos and photos. Curtsinger would also read his grandfather's National Geographic magazines for additional inspiration.

Further inspiration as a teenager would come in the form of a poem by Robinson Jeffers.

At the age of 16, Curtsinger bought his first camera, a Kodak Retinette 1A 35mm rangefinder. The first image ever taken by Curtsinger was a Northern red-bellied turtle at Pine Barrens.

U.S. Navy career

During the Vietnam War, in  after graduating high school at 18, Curtsinger attended Northern Arizona University in Flagstaff. After a year he transferred to Arizona State University in Tempe to join their photography program. During the transfer of schools he lost course credits and was deemed a second-year freshman. Because of this, the draft board reclassified him, making him eligible to be drafted into the Vietnam War effort. Curtsinger preemptively joined the United States Navy to circumvent being drafted into the United States Army.

Due to his interest in photography, the Navy excepted Curtsinger into the elite Navy Photo Unit, Atlantic Fleet Combat Camera Group based at Naval Station Norfolk. The camera unit was disestablished in 2018.

After graduating from U.S. Navy Dive School in Key West, Florida, curtsinger earned his Jump Wings in Lakehurst, New Jersey, and attended various U.S. Navy Flight Crew training units around Norfolk, Virginia. He traveled the world on special assignments for the United States Fleet Forces Command of the Atlantic Fleet, including the Navy's research and development department photographing new launches of submarines,. such as the USS Narwhal (SSN-671).

Curtsinger spent most of his Navy career covering the United States Navy carrier air operations. He qualified to fly in the F-4 Phantom and A-6 Intruder to carry out his photo missions. He was made an honorary member of the Red Rippers, U.S. Navy Fighter Squadron VF-11, and is credited as having the first color front and back covers in Naval Aviation News.

After six months in the Antarctic, Curtsinger approached Admiral George J. Dufek (Ret.), who at the time was the director of the Mariner's Museum in Newport News, Virginia, and knew of his work with Naval Aviation News and Antarctic Science. Dufek led the first U.S. science effort in the Antarctic during Operation Highjump. Curtsinger has stated that during a conversation with Dufek, he made a call to Gilbert M. Grosvenor, President of the National Geographic Society to set up a meeting to meet with Curtsinger.

in  Curtsinger was transferred to the United States Navy Reserve as a Petty officer second class, where he served until , retiring to pursue freelance photography for National Geographic.

Freelance career

Curtsinger is one of the first underwater photographers to capture extensive images of Marine life under the polar ice in Antarctica. He had been a freelance photographer since leaving the U.S. Navy with his photographic imagery focusing on underwater, natural history, maritime archaeology, people, culture, environments and wildlife. He has photographed thirty-three articles, including six cover stories, for the National Geographic Magazine. Curtsingers photos have also appeared on the cover of Orion, Life and Natural History magazines with stories in a number of other magazines such as BBC Wildlife and the Smithsonian magazine.

The subjects of Curtsinger's stories have included species and natural systems such as Harp seals, Right whales, Walruses, Monk seals, Penguins, Sea turtles,  Dolphins, Beavers, Porpoises, Pelicans, Salt Marshes, Rift Valley lakes and the New Jersey Pine Barrens. His stories have featured locations such as  Antarctica, the Arctic, the Baltic Sea, Hawaii, the Azores, Oceania, Russia, Central and South America, Canada, Great Britain and Africa.

Curtsingers work also includes numerous text books, journals and aquarium displays and he has been a contributor to Gulf of Maine Research Institute publications and website. He has eight titled published books including Extreme Nature: Images from the World's Edge, a four hundred page retrospective of his career, published in 2005 by White Star Publishers in nine languages.

Curtsinger has stated that his first assignment with National Geographic was pitched to Bob Gilka, by himself, because he knew the magazine had not published any articles about the Peninsula. Having spent six months in the cold barren landscape of Antarctica he knew that the peninsula was more interesting and more biological diverse than what was previously published in the Geographic. His very first article was a cover story in the November 1971 issue of National Geographic, Antarctica's Nearer Side by Samuel W. Matthews.

Grey reef shark

In January of  National Geographic published an article photographed and written by Curtsinger about Grey reef sharks. In a subsection of the story, he reminisces about a  encounter with the same species of sharks in the Micronesian lagoon in the Caroline Islands.

After this encounter he only needed minor reconstructive surgery to his hand and shoulder. He has stated that Grey reef sharks are extremely territorial, suspect in many attacks on indigenous islanders throughout Oceania and was most likely driving away a perceived competitor or predator.

Shipwrecks

Curtsinger has also photographed many shipwrecks throughout his career, like the Mary Rose at Portsmouth Harbour, which was active during the reign of Henry the VIII. He has also photographed the 16th century Basque whaling ship off the coast of Labrador, the 17th century Swedish warship, Kronan that sank in the Baltic Sea off the Swedish island of Öland and a 14th century Bronze Age Merchant ship, which was the oldest known shipwreck at that time.

In  he captured the sunken fleet of Operation Crossroads at Bikini Atoll in the Marshall Islands. National Geographic ran a story about the underwater wreckage in their June 1992 issue authored by John L. Elliot and photographed by Curtsinger. Also, a scientific journal was published for the United States Department of the Interior, The Archeology of the Atomic Bomb, featuring select images from Curtsinger.

Firsts

 First colored photographs published in the Naval Aviation News (1968)
 First published underwater photographs of Right whales (1972) Argentina
 First published underwater photographs of Narwhal whales
 First underwater photograph of Leopard seals (1971)

 First Photojournalist to cover the Mary Rose shipwreck.
 First photographs of Emperor penguins (flying) swimming underwater
 First photograph of a Blainville's beaked whale mother and calf.

Inspiring others

As new generations of photographers enter the field of photography, some have been inspired by Curtsingers work, like Brian Skerry. In a  article in The Maine Magazine, Skerry recalls Curtsinger turning down a National Geographic magazine photo shoot of the  pirate shipwreck Whydah Gally, buried in the sand off Cape Cod. Curtsinger turned down the job due to scheduling issues, but put in a good word for Skerry, who in turn, took the job. Skerry had his photos published in the May 1999 edition of National Geographic.

Personal life

In , during Curtsingers second photo assignment with National Geographic about salt marshes, he moved to Maine
, where in  he married Kate Mahoney. They had two children together, Justin and Owen. In June 2003, Mahoney passed away from a seven-year battle with breast Cancer. Curtsinger and Mahoney were married for twenty nine years and during that time, Mahoney was responsible for the organization and sales of Curtsingers stock photos business, which she created. Mahoney was a founding member of Peregrine Press located in Portland, Maine.

He became the co-owner, along with his second wife Sue Ohlson, of Sunrise Coffee Company.

Even though Curtsinger in no longer a freelancer in the field of photography, he continues to photograph and in  collaborated with Kenneth Brower on the book, Curtsinger: Reflections on the Life and Adventures of Bill Curtsinger.

Awards and recognition

 National Defense Service Medal
 Antarctica Service Medal
 National Geographic 100 Best wildlife photos
 "Outstanding Science Trade Book" National Science Teachers Association recognition for the book Sea Soup: Zooplankton
 NOGI Award Arts, Academy of Underwater Arts and Sciences
 Associate member of the Boston Sea Rovers
 Honorary member of Peregrine Press

Exhibitions

() "Underwater Nudes" – Evans Gallery, Portland, Maine
() "Images of Nature" – Westbrook College Campus Art Gallery, Westbrook College.
() "Photographing Maine: 1840 to 2000" – Maine Coast Artists, Rockport, Maine.
() "Elusivity" – Gold/Smith Gallery, Boothbay Harbor, Maine.
() "Annual 10X10 Group Show", In Honor of Kate Mahoney – June Fitzpatrick Gallery Portland, ME.
() "Peregrine Press Group Show" – Aucocisco Gallery, Portland, Maine.
() "Elusivity" One man show – The National Museum of Wildlife Art, Jackson Hole, Wyoming,
() "Extreme Nature: Images from the World's Edge" University of New England, Westbrook, ME.
() "Extreme Nature: Images from the World's Edge" – UMF Art Gallery, Farmington, Maine.
() "Prints from Peregrine Press" – University of Maine, Reed Art Gallery. Presque Isle
() "Oceans Expo II: A world to discover" – Instituto Cultural Peruano Norteamericano (ICPNA), Peru.
() "Prints from Peregrine Press" – Saco Art Museum Galley. Saco, Maine.
() "Underwater" Naturmuseum Senckenberg, Frankfurt, Germany
() "Photography by Bill Curtsinger" – Sunriver Lodge, Betty Grey Gallery, Sunriver, Oregon.
() "Photography by Bill Curtsinger" – Northwind Art's Grover Gallery, Port Townsend, Washington.

Bibliography

Cover stories
Magazine covers that have featured Curtsingers photos.

Books

Film and video

Journals

References

External links

 National Geographic photographer's page (UK)
 

Living people
1946 births
National Geographic photographers
20th-century photographers
American photographers
American male divers